Lakkidi-Perur-I  is a village in Palakkad district in the state of Kerala, India.

Demographics
 India census, Lakkidi-Perur-I had a population of 10,483 with 5,014 males and 5,469 females.

References

Villages in Palakkad district